, also written as (24978) 1998 HJ151, is a cubewano. It has a perihelion (closest approach to the Sun) of 41.339 AU and an aphelion (farthest approach to the Sun) of 45.889 AU. It has a diameter of about 139 km. It was discovered on 28 April 1998, by Jane X. Luu, Chadwick A. Trujillo, David J. Tholen and David C. Jewitt.

References

External links 
 

024978
Discoveries by Jane Luu
Discoveries by Chad Trujillo
Discoveries by David J. Tholen
Discoveries by David C. Jewitt
19980428